Breschi is an Italian surname. Notable people with the surname include:

Antonio Breschi (born 1950), Italian composer, pianist and trumpet player, singer, writer, poet, and music educator
Arrigo Breschi, Italian set decorator
Karen Breschi

See also
Bruschi

Italian-language surnames